Dhansa (also known as Dhansa-Border ) is a village in Delhi, India.

The village is situated in southwest Delhi, it is 25 km from Dwarka and around 30 km from Indira Gandhi International Airport.

Dhansa village is inhabited by Kaushik Brahmins and Dagar Jats.
This village is older than Mahabharat time the son of Bhim had dig a pond here named as Ghodai and the Lord Brahmas mandir named as Baba Budhe ka mandir adjoining Ghadoi and a Dam are the main features of this Dhansa Gaon...

References

Villages in South West Delhi district